Moon Jae-kwon (born 25 March 1998) is a South Korean swimmer. In 2018, he won the bronze medal in the mixed 4 × 100 metre medley relay event at the 2018 Asian Games held in Jakarta, Indonesia.

In 2019, he represented South Korea at the 2019 World Aquatics Championships in Gwangju, South Korea. He competed in the men's 50 metre breaststroke and men's 100 metre breaststroke events. He also competed in two relay events: the men's 4 × 100 metre medley relay and 4 × 100 metre mixed medley relay.

References

External links
 

Living people
1998 births
Place of birth missing (living people)
South Korean male breaststroke swimmers
Swimmers at the 2018 Asian Games
Asian Games bronze medalists for South Korea
Medalists at the 2018 Asian Games
Asian Games medalists in swimming
21st-century South Korean people